Oxenford Farm is a former abbey farm, a dependency of Waverley Abbey in the civil parish of Witley, Surrey, England, with several listed buildings around a courtyard, including three by Augustus Pugin.

Buildings
The three highest listed buildings, at Grade II*, are Gothic revival buildings designed by Palace of Westminster-famed Gothic revivalist Augustus Pugin.

Oxenford Gate Lodge - Grade II* 1843-44 by Pugin; approached over a bridge; includes octagonal turret, gable crucifix (cross) and bellcote.
Granary and Farm Buildings at Oxenford Farm - Grade II* 1843 by Pugin; buttressed and primarily built from ashlar dressed stone.
Barn at Oxenford Grange - Grade II*; buttressed and primarily built from ashlar dressed stone.
Oxenford Grange Farm House - Grade II possibly on medieval foundations but 17th, 19th and 20th century brick dressed sandstone rubble.
Oxenford Lodge - Grade II 1763 by William Chambers also for the estate of Viscount Middleton

Remains of Oxenford Grange

Remains of Oxenford Grange - Grade II the walls survive; date uncertain, listed as reputed to be remains of this dependency of Waverley Abbey; consistent with 13-14th gothic architecture; destroyed before 1775 when Peper Harow House was erected instead of an intended house on this site for Viscount Middleton.

History

Richer de Aquila (L'Aigle) granted Oxenford to Waverley Abbey before 1147.  It was a Cistercian monastery farming community for Waverley Abbey until 1536 when Oxenford was granted to Sir William Fitz William during the Dissolution of the Monasteries, when it was valued at £4 13s. 4d.

The buildings are in recent times within the nearby Peper Harow estate.

Popular culture
The buildings and their surrounding grounds, near small woods less than 100 metres away to the south and west, were used as a location for Robin Hood (2010 film).

References

External links
https://web.archive.org/web/20120424045321/http://www.peperharow.info/oxenfrd.htm

Gothic Revival architecture in Surrey
Archaeological sites in Surrey